Ignacio Rafael García Escudero, known as Rafael Albaicín, was a Spanish matador and film actor who was born on 5 June 1919 in Madrid, and died on 3 September 1981.

In 1948 he began as matador in Las Ventas, taught by Cagancho. He also played the piano and violin, and he designed his traje de luces. As an actor, he appeared in Shéhérazade (1963), Vamos a matar, compañeros and The Ceremony. He also played himself in Watch Out, We're Mad! (1974), a bandit in Navajo Joe (1966), and Alberto in Catlow (1971),

Filmography

References

External links
 

1919 births
1981 deaths
Spanish Romani people
Spanish bullfighters
Spanish male film actors